Andhra Cricket Association Women's Cricket Academy Ground is a multi purpose stadium in Guntur, Andhra Pradesh. The ground is mainly used for organizing matches of football, cricket and other sports. The ground is home of India women's national cricket team and Women's Cricket Academy is located. The ground is yet to hosted international match but has many women's domestic mathes.

References

External links 
 cricketarchive
 ACA official

Cricket grounds in Andhra Pradesh
Sport in Guntur
Buildings and structures in Guntur
Sports venues completed in 2011
2011 establishments in Andhra Pradesh
Women's cricket in India